The Bad Boy: The Most Wanted Edition is a compilation album by former reggaeton artist Héctor el Father. It was released on October 9, 2007. It's also a special edition version of his first solo album. The album features guest appearances from Mr. Notty, Ednita Nazario, Ken-Y, Polaco, Wisin & Yandel, Jowell & Randy, Yomo, Naldo, Omega and Toby Love. The album was supported by the single "Pa' La Tumba" which was released alongside the album on October 9, 2007.

Track listing

Disc 1

Disc 2

References 

Héctor el Father albums
2007 video albums
2007 compilation albums